Kesmai was a pioneering game developer and online game publisher, founded in 1981 by Kelton Flinn and John Taylor.  The company was best known for the combat flight sim Air Warrior on the GEnie online service, one of the first graphical MMOGs, launched in 1987.  They also developed an ASCII-based MUD, Island of Kesmai, which ran on CompuServe.

The company was acquired by Rupert Murdoch's News Corp. in 1994.  The company continued to develop massively multiplayer games such as Air Warrior 2 and Legends of Kesmai. They distributed their games through AOL and eventually a new gaming service formed with three other publishers, GameStorm.

AOL purchased CompuServe in 1997 and retooled its AOL Games Channel in a way that placed Kesmai unfavorably compared to its own games division, WordPlay. Kesmai sued AOL for monopolistic practices. The suit was settled out of court with undisclosed terms.

In 1999, the company was sold to Electronic Arts, and the company's studios were subsequently closed in 2001. Upon closure a number of the Kesmai staff went to work for Lodestone Games, also located in Charlottesville, Virginia; while others remained in the former Kesmai offices but became part of EA.com and later Maxis East.

Flinn selected the name Kesmai from a set of names that were output by a random name generator that he wrote for in-game use.

Games

References

Defunct video game companies of the United States
MUD organizations
Defunct companies based in Virginia
Video game companies established in 1981
Video game companies disestablished in 2001
1981 establishments in Virginia
2001 disestablishments in Virginia
Electronic Arts